(AJ Layalpuria)  AJ+ (Al Jazeera plus) is a social media publisher owned by Al Jazeera Media Network which focuses on news and current affairs. AJ+ content exists in English, Arabic, French, and Spanish. It is available on its website, YouTube, Facebook, Instagram, and Twitter, with written content on Medium.

Work on the channel started in December 2012, shortly after Al Jazeera established an office in San Francisco. The first YouTube channel went live on December 17, 2013. The channel then had a soft launch on June 13, 2014. A full launch followed on September 15, 2014.

History
Al Jazeera Media Network originally planned to launch an Internet-only TV channel in 2010 as part of its social media strategy but later became pre-occupied with the Arab Spring. Plans for an internet-only channel were re-launched upon the launch of Al Jazeera America when Al Jazeera Media Network had to geo-block most video from Al Jazeera English including the channel's live stream to satisfy concerns from cable and satellite providers in the United States. The move was met with dissatisfaction from both viewers and Al Jazeera English producers and hosts.

Also with the purchase of Current TV to use for Al Jazeera America, AJMN acquired Current's former headquarters in San Francisco which was perfect for the type of channel Al Jazeera wanted to build being in the new media mecca of the San Francisco Bay Area and the building being already fitted to accommodate an online operation due to the original format of Current as a user-generated channel with heavy Internet integration.

In January 2012, members of the network's social media team relocated some of its staff to San Francisco to focus on building AJ+. After months of research and numerous pilots, the AJMN executive management were convinced of the project and providing funding and resources to scale. AJ+ is the first incubated project out Al Jazeera's Innovation & Incubation Department.

In October 2013, it was announced that Al Jazeera Media Network would establish an Internet-only TV channel based entirely online called AJ+ based in San Francisco to launch sometime in 2014. Led by a strategy team consisting of Riyaad Minty, Moeed Ahmad, and Muhammad Cajee, after a year of preparation the channel placed several test videos on YouTube in late 2013 followed by a soft launch in June 2014 with a full launch complete with a mobile app later in 2014.

The channel was announced as launched on June 13, 2014, by Al Jazeera PR with several videos posted to YouTube and a new Facebook page which it refers to as the AJ+ Community along with a new-look website with an updated logo. The channel was soft-launched during a presentation by Al Jazeera on new media at the Global Editors Network summit in Barcelona. The channel soft launched beginning with the tweet "We can confirm that this is our first official tweet. Because that's what real journalism is about. We're @AJPlus. Hello World :)". The tweet was partly a pun of the first tweet sent out by the CIA earlier in the month.

In July 2014, the channel created a fellowship program and issued a call for fellows from five regions of the world in North America, South America, The Middle East, Europe, The Asia Pacific and Sub-Saharan Africa. In August 2014, the channel branched out to Instagram. On September 15, 2014, the channel launched fully with the release of its mobile app. The launch was attended by Al Jazeera Media Network Director General Mostefa Souag who stated "AJ reshaped media in 1996 when it launched, Sept 15th marks the new phase of change with AJ+".

AJ+ Español soft-launched in April 2015 to start testing content in a different language.

According to Variety, in June 2015 AJ+ became the second largest news video producer on Facebook, after NowThis News. They are the ninth largest video producer on the platform overall.

On August 12, 2015, AJ+ announced the appointment of its first managing director, Dima Khatib.

In August 2015, AJ+ released data showing that it has a 600% engagement rate on Facebook, making the network's Facebook page one of the most engaged news brands in the world. As of April 2018, its Facebook page had obtained over ten million 'likes' from users.

In October 2015, AJ+ announced that the channel had reached over one billion views across its platforms.

In 2017, AJ+ launched a French-language version of the service. In 2018, the English version of the channel moved its operations to Washington D.C. In April 2018, AJ+ ended the use of its mobile apps, moving to content distribution over its website, various social media and YouTube.

In September 2020, AJ+ was asked to register under the Foreign Agents Registration Act (FARA) in the United States with the Trump Administration charging that the channel has engaged in political activities, backed by the royal family of Qatar. Al Jazeera condemned the decision and linked it to the results of 3 years long lobbying fulfilled following the signing of Israel–United Arab Emirates peace agreement.

Format
AJ+ produces video and media directly to social platforms (Facebook, YouTube, Twitter and Instagram), through native apps on mobile devices (iOS and Android) and smart TV platforms (Apple TV, Android TV, and Amazon Fire TV).

AJ+ is separate from Al Jazeera's other cable and satellite news channels, though it shares the network's current 68 bureaus with the other channels.

The channel is headquartered in Washington D.C. Originally, it was headquartered San Francisco, California, in the expanded former headquarters and studio of Current TV. The channel has branch offices in Doha, Qatar, Istanbul, Rio de Janeiro, Kuala Lumpur and Nairobi. It also collects and creates content through freelancers in other areas of interest.

Despite being based in the United States, the content of the channel is formatted for a global audience similar to Al Jazeera English. The channel has no hosts or anchors, and live reporting plays a lesser role. Most content is available on demand.

AJ+ offers news coverage from around the world, and also covers topics like lifestyle, culture and technology with very little text. Its videos range from 15 seconds to 10 minutes.

The channel is experimenting with various storytelling formats. It supports a high level of user interactions in the app and its Facebook, YouTube and Twitter platforms as well.

An Arabic-language version of AJ+ was launched in 2015. There is also a test Spanish version of the channel based out of San Francisco.

Videos from the channel are occasionally featured on the websites of Al Jazeera English and Al Jazeera America, before its closure, as a further in-depth feature of that website if the site is covering the same topic.

Video format
 Real Time - Breaking and topical news published directly to social feeds, ranging in length from 30 seconds to three minutes
 In Depth - Video features, contextual background pieces, monthly themes, and shows
 Animated Explainers
 Satire
 Current Events
 AJ+ Asks
 Short Docs - documentaries generally ranging in length from 6–10 minutes
 Video Journalists - Correspondent pieces shot on location around the world.
 TED & AJ+ - explainers in cooperation with TED

Presenters
 Dena Takruri – Senior presenter/producer
 Francesca Fiorentini - Senior presenter/producer
 Sana Saeed – Presenter/producer
 Imaeyen Ibanga - Presenter/producer
 Yara Elmjouie- Host and Producer
 Gelareh Darabi- Presenter.
 Tamim al-Barghouti (Arabic)
  (Arabic)

Former presenters
 Ahmed Shihab-Eldin - Senior presenter/producer
 Imran Garda – Senior presenter/producer 
 Muna Hawwa (Arabic)
  (Arabic)

AJ+ occasionally features Al Jazeera English and before shutdown Al Jazeera America correspondents depending upon what story they are covering.

Former mobile app
The AJ+ Mobile App launched in September 2014 on iOS and Android platforms which was used until April 2018. The app employed a card and stack structure for navigation, and focuses primarily on user and social engagement.

Awards and honors
 In 2015, AJ+ won a Webby Award for Online Film & Video, News & Information 
 At the 2015 Webby Awards, AJ+ was also honored in the categories of
 Online Film & Video, News & Politics: Individual Episode (Ayotzinapa Student Killings Ignite Mexico and the Internet) 
 Online Film & Video, Documentary: Series (AJ+ Short Docs)
 Mobile Sites & Apps, News (AJ+ Mobile App)
 In 2015, the AJ+ Mobile App was a finalist for the Society for News Design's World's Best Digital Design award

Controversy
AJ+ has come under criticism from conservative and pro-Israel publications for a perceived anti-American, anti-Israeli, and leftist slant in its reporting.

The French National Audiovisual Institute has criticized AJ+ for its practice of generating viewer engagement through what it sees as one-sided reporting on emotional topics. The institute claims three-quarters of its tweets mentioned the Israeli–Palestinian conflict, racism, or police violence, and that the alleged editorial line of the channel serves to further the Emirate of Qatar's influence and presents ideological similarities with the Muslim Brotherhood.

In 2019, AJ+ produced a video that denied and minimized the Holocaust. Its parent company, Al Jazeera, suspended two journalists over the video. The video stated that "[the] number [of Jews murdered in the Holocaust] had been exaggerated and 'adopted by the Zionist movement', and that Israel is the 'biggest winner' from the genocide."

See also
 Al Jazeera Podcasts, partner podcast network 
 Al Jazeera English
 Al Jazeera America
 TouchVision, a former internet video news provider
 The Young Turks

References

External links

 

Al Jazeera
Internet properties established in 2014
2014 establishments in California
YouTube channels
Video on demand services
Internet television channels
American news websites
Mass media about Internet culture